Lori-Ann Muenzer (born May 21, 1966) is a Canadian track cyclist and gold medal winning athlete at the 2004 Summer Olympics in the Match Sprint. Muenzer was the first track cycling Olympic gold medallist in Canadian history.

Born in Toronto, Ontario, Muenzer attended Runnymede Collegiate Institute. She won a silver medal at the 2001 World championships in Antwerp, Belgium in the 500m time trial and a bronze in the sprint, she won a silver at the 2000 World Championships in Manchester, England in the sprint, and a bronze medal at the 2004 world championships in Melbourne, Australia in the sprint.

External links 
 Lori-Ann Muenzer's web site 
 "Canadian Olympian Muenzer retires" on CBC.ca

1966 births
Living people
Canadian female cyclists
Canadian people of German descent
Cyclists at the 2000 Summer Olympics
Cyclists at the 2004 Summer Olympics
Olympic cyclists of Canada
Olympic gold medalists for Canada
Olympic medalists in cycling
Sportspeople from Toronto
Canadian track cyclists
Medalists at the 2004 Summer Olympics
Commonwealth Games medallists in cycling
Commonwealth Games silver medallists for Canada
Commonwealth Games bronze medallists for Canada
Cyclists at the 1998 Commonwealth Games
Cyclists at the 2002 Commonwealth Games
Medallists at the 1998 Commonwealth Games
Medallists at the 2002 Commonwealth Games